Enter the Mirror is a studio album by American band Maserati. It was released on April 3, 2020 under Temporary Residence Limited.

Critical reception
Enter the Mirror was met with "generally favorable" reviews from critics. At Metacritic, which assigns a weighted average rating out of 100 to reviews from mainstream publications, this release received an average score of 78, based on 4 reviews.

Track listing

References

2020 albums
Maserati (band) albums
Temporary Residence Limited albums